The following squads were named for the 1968 Summer Olympics tournament.

Brazil 

Head coach: Marão

Bulgaria 

Head coach: Georgi Berkov

1Vasilev was born in 1944 but the birth date was changed in his passport so he could be eligible for the reinstated 1969 Balkan Youth Cup.

Colombia 

Head coach: Edgar Barona

Czechoslovakia 

Head coach: Václav Blažejovský

El Salvador 

Head coach: Rigoberto Guzmán

France 

Head coach: André Grillon

Ghana 

Head coach:  Karl-Heinz Marotzke

Guatemala 

Head coach:  César Viccino

Guinea 

Head coach: Nabi Camara

Hungary 

Head coach: Károly Lakat

Israel 

Head coach: Emmanuel Scheffer

Japan 

Head coach:  Ken Naganuma

Mexico 

Head coach: Ignacio Trelles

Nigeria 

Head coach:  József Ember

Spain 

Head coach:  José Santamaría

Thailand 

Head coach:  Günther Glomb

References

External links
 FIFA
 RSSSF

Olympics
1968 Summer Olympics